Navico is a marine electronics company providing navigation, marine instruments and fish finding equipment to both the recreational and commercial marine sectors.

The Navico Recreational Marine Division is one of the world's largest provider of leisure marine electronic products. Lowrance is aimed at fishing, particularly in freshwater and near coastal areas. Simrad Yachting is focused on powerboat owners for cruising and sportfishing and B&G serves the sailing market.

The Simrad Commercial Marine Electronics division also offers navigation products for the commercial market, while C-MAP provides cartography and digital products to both recreational and commercial markets.

Navico has its headquarters in Egersund, Norway, and the group has manufacturing facilities in the United States, UK, Norway, Mexico and New Zealand.

Time line

1946 Simonsen Radio was founded by Willy Simonsen (NOR) leading the development of echo sounding equipment. Simrad Yachting was born from the union of Simonsen Radio and other marine technology pioneers.

1955 Brookes & Gatehouse (B&G) was founded by Major R.N Gatehouse and Ronald Brookes (UK).

1957 Lowrance Electronics created by Darrell Lowrance (USA) and launched the first recreational sonar product for anglers – the Fish-Lo-K-Tor, also known as the ‘Little Green Box’.

2003 Simrad Yachting acquired B&G.

2005 Altor 2003 Fund acquires Simrad Yachting AS from Kongsberg Group.

2006 Altor 2003 Fund acquires Lowrance Electronics.

2006 Navico was created through the merger of Simrad Yachting and Lowrance Electronics by their common owners, Altor Equity Partners, a Swedish private equity firm.

2007 Navico acquire the marine electronics business of Brunswick New Technologies creating the world’s largest supplier of marine electronics for recreational boats.

2016 Goldman Sachs Merchant Banking Division and Altor Fund IV signed an agreement to acquire Navico Holding AS (Navico) and Digital Marine Solutions Holding AS (Digital Marine Solutions), owner of Jeppesen Marine, from the Altor 2003 Fund.

2016 Navico expands manufacturing plant in Ensenada, Mexico adding 50,000 sq ft.

2017 Navico acquire C-MAP, providing cartography products and services for all types of leisure boaters, from fishermen and sailing enthusiasts to powerboat owners around the world.

2019 Knut Frostad appointed as President and CEO of Navico.

2021 Brunswick Corporation acquired Navico.

Brand summaries

B&G 
B&G, formerly Brookes and Gatehouse, was founded over 60 years ago and manufactures sailing electronics for cruising and racing yachts. B&G systems are used by professional race boats as well as amateur club racers and sailing superyachts. The B&G range encompasses chartplotters, navigation equipment, instruments, autopilots and radar, plus tactical racing software and other performance measurement and analysis.

Lowrance 
Lowrance has been a manufacturer of fishfinding equipment and marine electronics since 1957. Lowrance delivered the first consumer fishfinder, the first colour fishfinder, the first sonar/GPS combo, the first digital sonar and grayline/colourline.

Simrad Yachting 
Simrad Yachting traces its roots back over seventy years ago when its founder patented new wireless communications for fishing vessels. Simrad Yachting is now a marine electronics brand which manufactures a wide range of instruments for recreational vessels of all sizes, from small runabouts and sportfishing boats up to luxury cruisers and superyachts. The Simrad Yachting range includes integrated high-performance navigation and information display systems with touch-screen and remote control, communications equipment, autopilots, safety electronics and radar systems.

Simrad Commercial Marine Electronics 
Simrad Commercial is an electronics technology for commercial vessels. Over the past seventy years they have developed systems for commercial vessels offering a range of  radar systems, auto steering, navigation and safety products for vessels of all sizes, from small vessels on inland waterways to larger coastal commercial and passenger craft.

C-MAP 
Founded in 1985, C-MAP serves boaters worldwide, providing cartography products and services for all types of leisure boaters, from fishermen and sailing enthusiasts to powerboat owners. C-MAP worldwide cartography products and services include multiple formats for lakes, coasts and oceans.

C-MAP also provided products and services to the commercial marine sector. The majority of C-MAPs products and services for this sector were sold to Lloyd's Register in December 2020.

References 

Electronics companies established in 2006
Manufacturing companies of Norway
Navigation system companies
Companies based in Rogaland
Fishing equipment manufacturers
Marine electronics
Norwegian brands
2021 mergers and acquisitions
Norwegian companies established in 2006